Montgomery Locks and Dam is a lock and dam on the Ohio River, located 32 miles downstream of Pittsburgh.  There are two locks, one for commercial barge traffic that's 600 feet long by 110 feet wide, and the recreational auxiliary lock is 360 feet long by 56 feet wide.  Montgomery locks averages about 300 commercial lock throughs every month and  150 lock throughs a month on the recreational auxiliary lock. The average cost to keep the lock and dam operationally ready averaged $5.8 million per year from the years 2010-2014.

See also
 List of locks and dams of the Ohio River
 List of locks and dams of the Upper Mississippi River

References

External links
U.S. Army Corps of Engineers, Pittsburgh District
U.S. Army Corps of Engineers, Huntington District
U.S. Army Corps of Engineers, Louisville District

Dams on the Ohio River
Locks of Pennsylvania
Dams completed in 1936
United States Army Corps of Engineers, Pittsburgh District